Cnemaspis grismeri, also known as the Grismer's rock gecko, is a species of geckos endemic to Malaysia.

References

Cnemaspis
Lizards of Asia
Reptiles described in 2013